Megalobrama pellegrini is a species of cyprinid fish endemic to upper reaches of the Yangtze River. It grows to  TL.

References

Megalobrama
Cyprinid fish of Asia
Endemic fauna of China
Freshwater fish of China
Taxa named by Tchang Tchung-Lin
Fish described in 1930